Warring States may refer to:

 Warring States period, second period of the Eastern Zhou Dynasty of ancient China
 Seven Warring States, the seven major states of the period
 The Warring States (film), 2011 film based on the period
 Sengoku period or Warring States period of Japan
 Warring States, a novel by Mags L. Halliday
 American Civil War

See also
 Record of the Warring States, a work compiled in the Han dynasty, from which the period derives its name